Otroeopsis is a genus of longhorn beetles of the subfamily Lamiinae, containing the following species:

 Otroeopsis affinis Breuning, 1939
 Otroeopsis virescens (Pascoe, 1866)

References

Desmiphorini